David More (born 1954) is a Scottish botanical illustrator.

More was born in Dingwall and educated in Kent. He has been a botanical illustrator for many years. Books he has illustrated include Collins GEM Trees (1980), Trees of North America (1988), with the late Alan Mitchell, and the Illustrated Encyclopedia of Trees (2003) by John White. He has also contributed artwork for many other books, magazines and posters, including a design for the Natural History Museum in London.

References

Collins Tree Guide. By Owen Johnson. Illustrated by David More.

1954 births
Living people
People from Dingwall